The Badminton Competition at the 2003 Pan American Games was held from August 1 to August 17, 2003 in Santo Domingo, Dominican Republic at the UASD Pavilion, which sat 1,700 for the games.

There were a total number of five events, singles and doubles for men and women, along with a mixed doubles event.

Medal table

Medalists

Participating nations
A total of 11 nations entered players in the badminton competitions, with a total of 73 athletes.

References

External links
 Tournament result

 
P
2003
Badminton tournaments in the Dominican Republic
Events at the 2003 Pan American Games